"Giants" is a song by American experimental rock band Bear Hands. The song was released in late 2013 as the lead single from the band's second album, Distraction, and peaked at number eight on the Billboard Alternative Songs chart. The song is featured in the 2014 ice hockey video game NHL 15.

Commercial performance
The song was the first song by the band to chart, reaching number eight on the Billboard Alternative Songs chart.

Charts

Weekly charts

Year-end charts

Release history

References

2013 songs
2013 singles
Cantora Records singles
Bear Hands songs
Music videos directed by Mark Pellington